The Newseum was an American museum dedicated to news and journalism that promoted free expression and the First Amendment to the United States Constitution, while tracing the evolution of communication.

The purpose of the museum, funded by the Freedom Forum nonpartisan U.S. foundation dedicated to freedom of the press, freedom of speech, and freedom of thought for was to help the public and the media understand each other. 

The seven-level,  museum was located in Washington, D.C., and featured fifteen theaters and fifteen galleries. Its Berlin Wall Gallery included the largest display of sections of the wall outside Germany. The Today's Front Pages Gallery presented daily front pages from more than 80 international newspapers. The Today's Front Pages Gallery is still available on the Newseum's website, along with a few other galleries. 
Other galleries presented topics including the First Amendment, world press freedom, news history, the September 11 attacks, and the history of the Internet, TV, and radio.

It opened at its first location in Rosslyn, Virginia, on April 18, 1997, and on April 11, 2008, it opened at its last location. As of December 31, 2019, the Newseum closed its doors and many exhibits and artifacts went into storage or were returned to their owners.

The Newseum attracted more than 815,000 visitors a year, and its television studios hosted news broadcasts. There was an admission fee for adults. The institution saw years of financial losses. In February 2018, these losses led to an exploration of selling its building or moving to another location. In January 2019, the Freedom Forum announced The Johns Hopkins University would purchase the building for $372.5 million in order to use the space for several graduate programs.

History 

Freedom Forum is a non-profit organization founded in 1991 by publisher Al Neuharth, founder of the newspaper USA Today, based on the previous Gannett Foundation.  Freedom Forum opened the Newseum in Arlington, Virginia, in 1997. Prior to opening in Virginia, it maintained exhibition galleries in Nashville and Manhattan, the latter in the lobby of the former IBM Building at 590 Madison Avenue. In 2000, Freedom Forum decided to move the museum across the Potomac River to downtown Washington, D.C. The original site was closed on March 3, 2002, to allow its staff to concentrate on building the new, larger museum. The new museum, built at a cost of $450 million, opened its doors to the public on April 11, 2008.

Tim Russert, a Newseum trustee, said, "The Newseum made a pretty good impression in Arlington, but at your new location on Pennsylvania Avenue, you will make an indelible mark."

The Newseum on Pennsylvania Avenue shares a block adjacent to the Canadian Embassy.

After obtaining a landmark location at Pennsylvania Avenue and Sixth Street NW, the former site of National Hotel, the Newseum board selected noted exhibit designer Ralph Appelbaum, who had designed the original site in Arlington, Virginia, and architect James Stewart Polshek, who designed the Rose Center for Earth and Space with Todd Schliemann at the American Museum of Natural History in New York City, to work on the new project.

This design team had the following goals:
 To design a building that would be an architectural icon, easily recognized and remembered by visitors from around the world;
 To create a museum space three times as large as the original, with the capacity for more than two million visitors a year; and
 To celebrate the First Amendment to the United States Constitution – in particular, its freedom of the press and freedom of speech protections.

Highlights of the building design unveiled October 2002 include a façade featuring a "window on the world", which looks out on Pennsylvania Avenue and the National Mall while letting the public see inside to the visitors and displays. It features the 45 words of the First Amendment to the U.S. Constitution, etched into a four story tall stone panel facing Pennsylvania Avenue.

One feature carried over from the prior Arlington site was the Journalists Memorial, a glass sculpture listing the names of 2,291 journalists from around the world killed in the line of duty. It is updated and rededicated annually.

The museum website is updated daily with images and PDF versions of newspaper front pages from around the world. Images are replaced daily, but an archive of front pages from notable events since 2001 is also available. Hard copies of selected front pages, including one from every U.S. state and Washington, D.C., were displayed in galleries within the museum and outside the front entrance.

Jerry Frieheim, a 1956 graduate of the University of Missouri School of Journalism, was the first executive director of the Newseum and claims to have coined the name.

Building
The structural engineer for this project was Leslie E. Robertson Associates.

The building was also known for the largest and tallest hydraulic passenger elevators in the world, with a capacity of  capable of carrying up to 72 passengers when fully loaded, and a travel distance of  that covers 7 floors. A curving glass memorial to slain journalists was located above the ground floor.

Showcase environments throughout the museum were climate controlled by four microclimate control devices. These units provided a flow of humidified air to the cases through a system of distribution pipes.

ABC's This Week began broadcasting from a new studio in the Newseum on April 20, 2008, with George Stephanopoulos as host. ABC moved This Week back to its Washington, D.C. bureau in June 2013 citing the network's infrequent use of the Newseum studio compared to the cost of operating and maintaining a studio there. The studio was later home to Al Jazeera America's Washington, D.C. bureau which also had editing facilities and office space in the building.

Sharing the building with the Newseum were The Source, a Wolfgang Puck Restaurant, and the Newseum Residences, a collection of 135 luxury apartment homes. The building's amenities include a rooftop terrace, which shared the Newseum's views of the National Mall, Washington Monument and the United States Capitol.

The building is featured in the background of the season 2 finale for the show Jack Ryan.

Critical response
Journalist Alan Rusbridger of The Guardian wrote that visitors would have "a great family day out"; considered some of the exhibits, such as a red dress worn by Helen Thomas, as "faintly ridiculous" while praising others such as a large chunk of the actual Berlin Wall. Although writing that the Newseum displayed "self-glorification, pomposity and vanity" in an "overwhelmingly American-centric" way, he described the building design as "uplifting" and generally commended the features. Michael Landauer of the Dallas Morning News praised its interactive exhibits, writing: "While the free Smithsonian museums do a fine job of housing our important artifacts, I believe the Newseum on Pennsylvania Avenue does an unparalleled job of telling our nation's story." Bonnie Wach, writing for the San Francisco Chronicle praised the Newseum's interactive exhibits, calling it "a marvel of technological innovation" and citing its "seven floors of touch-screens, theaters, film and video, state-of-the-art studios, computer games, interactive kiosks, documentary footage and hands-on multimedia exhibits."

Other reviewers were more critical. Nicolai Ouroussoff, architecture critic for the New York Times, panned the second Newseum building as "the latest reason to lament the state of contemporary architecture in" Washington, D.C. Writing on the Newseum's content, Times culture critic Edward Rothstein wrote that "a good portion of the museum’s earnestly sought attention is well deserved" but "the museum’s preening does call for some skepticism." Gannett's USA Today noted that while reviews of the building's architecture had been mixed, the high number of visitors was a sign that the Newseum was successful, even in a capital city full of museums. James Bowman of National Review Online criticized the Newseum's interaction-heavy exhibits as overly stylistic and superficial, writing that it focuses on headline-based reporting of major world events rather than details of the events themselves. The AIA Guide to the Architecture of Washington DC describes the view from the Avenue as a "barrage, with numerous elements vying for your attention. ... a virtual national television set (or computer screen)."

An exhibit at the Newseum discussed the "effort to avoid bias" by journalists. It included a 2006 Gallup poll in which 44% of Americans called the media "too liberal" while only 19% found it "too conservative" as well as other comments on possible political media bias, many of which came from Fox News contributors. Jonathan Schwarz of Mother Jones criticized the exhibit and called it an example of corporate propaganda from Rupert Murdoch's News Corporation. He also argued that most of the U.S. news media is controlled by businesses who shut out stories that would counter their interests. Kevin D. Williamson of National Review Online defended the Newseum, calling the criticism "nonsense concentrate" and arguing that media-owning companies have an interest in promoting non-conservative causes.

Jack Shafer, co-editor of Slate, criticized the Newseum's exhibit about the career of the late NBC reporter Tim Russert. He argued that Russert's "mundane" work-space was not worthy of preservation in a museum and that Russert's accomplishments "begin at being a pretty good interviewer and end at having a lot of celebrity friends." He concluded that the Newseum is "a place where journalist celebrities begin to be worshipped as miracle-producing saints."

Al Aqsa TV controversy 

In the May 2013 rededication ceremony of the Journalist Memorial, the Newseum first decided to honor two Al Aqsa TV members as part of the memorial, and then withdrew them after criticism from pro-Israeli organizations. After a year-long review of the circumstances surrounding their deaths, the Newseum, in partnership with other journalism organizations decided their names would remain on the Journalists Memorial wall.

Ilene Prusher, columnist for the Israeli newspaper Haaretz, said that the Newseum stepped into the "minefield" of the Arab–Israeli conflict. Al-Aqsa TV is affiliated with Hamas in the Gaza Strip, and the two deceased journalists were killed by Israeli fire in a car marked "TV". Israeli Defense Forces spokeswoman, Lt. Col. Avital Leibovich, said that they were killed deliberately, not accidentally, because they "have relevance to terror activity.”

Nearly all journalistic organizations hold that the men were killed in the line of duty, including the Committee to Protect Journalists, Reporters Without Borders, the International Federation of Journalists and the World Association of Newspapers and News Publishers. Human Rights Watch said that their investigation in Gaza showed no evidence that the men were involved in militant activity. NBC News chief foreign correspondent Richard Engel said at the Newseum's dedication ceremony that it was difficult to draw the line, and several reporters on the list were Syrians who were also activists who were trying to topple Bashar al-Assad's government. David Carr of the New York Times said that "the evidence so far suggests that they were journalists, however partisan.”

Permanent exhibits

The New York Times—Ochs-Sulzberger Family Great Hall: Located in the atrium, a 90-foot-high screen showed the latest headlines from around the globe. A satellite replica and a Bell helicopter (formerly used by KXAS-TV in Dallas) were also suspended in the atrium.

News Corporation News History Gallery: A timeline showcased the extensive collection of newspapers and magazines. Touch-screen computers housed hundreds of digitized publications, allowing for close-up viewing, as well as interactive games, and access to a database of journalists. Hundreds of artifacts and memorabilia from remarkable news events were in cases around the gallery. Included in this gallery was a 1603 English broadsheet showing the coronation of James I; a 1787 copy of the Maryland Gazette containing the new United States Constitution; The Charleston Mercurys 1860 extra enthusiastically proclaiming, “The Union Is Dissolved!”; a copy of the 1948 Chicago Daily Tribune mistakenly announcing, “Dewey Defeats Truman.”

NBC News Interactive Newsroom: The Interactive Newsroom let visitors play the role of a photojournalist, editor, reporter, or anchor. Touch-screen stations provided simulated tools and techniques needed to be in the broadcast business. Visitors could also pick up a microphone and step in front of the camera.

9/11 Gallery Sponsored by Comcast: This gallery explored the coverage of September 11, 2001. A tribute to photojournalist William Biggart, who died covering the attacks, was included. Visitors got to hear his story and see some of the final photographs he took. A giant wall was covered with worldwide front pages published the following morning, and a portion of the communications antenna from the roof of the World Trade Center was on display with a timeline of the reports and bulletins that were issued as the day unfolded. A film gave additional first-person accounts from reporters and photographers who covered the story.

Bloomberg Internet, TV and Radio Gallery: News increases as technology improves. This gallery traced the evolution of electronic media.

Pulitzer Prize Photographs Gallery: The Newseum put on display the most comprehensive collection of Pulitzer Prize-winning photographs ever gathered. It included every Pulitzer Prize winning entry since 1942. Many of the photographers were interviewed in a documentary film, providing context for the pictures and insight into their craft. Some photographs included are: Raising the Flag on Iwo Jima, Burst of Joy (the joyful reunion of a returning prisoner of war and his family), a firefighter cradling a mortally injured infant after the Oklahoma City bombing. Visitors could access a database of 300 video clips, 400 audio clips and 1,000 prize photos. The gallery underwent a month long renovation and reopened in September 2016 with an updated display of 40 large-scale photographs tracing the history of the award.

Berlin Wall Gallery: The Newseum had procured the largest display of the original wall outside of Germany.

Cox Enterprises First Amendment Gallery: This gallery explored the role that the First Amendment's guarantee of rights (religion, speech, press, assembly and petition)  has played in the United States over the past 200 years. The exhibit presented historical news clips that exemplify the five freedoms. "Our liberty depends on the freedom of the press," said Thomas Jefferson, "and that cannot be limited without being lost."

Time Warner World News Gallery: In this gallery, a large map, rating 190 countries, illustrated the differences in press freedom around the world. Newspaper Headlines and international television feeds were available for examination. International journalists who risked their lives on the job were also heralded here.

Today's Front Pages Gallery: The Newseum received digital submissions of over 700 front pages from around the world. Roughly 80 were enlarged and printed for display in this space and additional papers line the entrance of the building. One from every state and the District of Columbia was chosen as well as a sampling of international newspapers.

FBI Exhibit: The "Inside Today's FBI" exhibit gave visitors a view into the FBI's work, with a focus on the fight against terrorism and cybercrime in the post 9/11 world. Artifacts in the exhibit included the Unabomber's cabin, a car belonging to the 9/11 hijackers that was found abandoned in a Virginia airport parking lot, engine parts from the plane that crashed into the World Trade Center South Tower on 9/11, and running shoes belonging to a Boston Globe reporter who went from running in the Boston Marathon to covering the terrorist attack.

Journalists Memorial: Memorialized journalists who died in the course of their duties. This exhibit displayed artifacts from hazardous journalistic missions. Included was the laptop computer used by Daniel Pearl, the bloodstained notebook of Michael Weisskopf, and the 1976 Datsun 710 belonging to Don Bolles that was bombed in Phoenix, Arizona. Also featured was a sobering display of more than 1,800 names written in a glass tablet, marking the deaths of those who died in pursuit of the news. The gallery also contained photographs of hundreds of those journalists and access to more detailed information on every honored journalist.

Hank Greenspun Terrace on Pennsylvania Avenue: The Newseum terrace offered a panoramic view of Washington, DC overlooking one of America's most iconic streets, Pennsylvania Avenue. The view included landmarks and monuments such as the U.S. Capitol, the National Gallery of Art, the National Archives Building and the Washington Monument. On the terrace visitors could read about the events that played a role in developing Pennsylvania Avenue, from presidential parades and funeral processions to celebrations and protests. The 2009 Obama Inauguration parade was covered by cable news outlets from the Terrace.

The Bancroft Family Ethics Center: In the Ethics Center, computers allowed visitors to debate journalistic dilemmas and compare their answers with reporters and other visitors.

Financial losses and building closure
Despite a substantial revenue stream of rents, museum admissions, and event fees, the Newseum lost a significant amount of money. In 2011, ticket sales offset just 10 percent of expenses. In 2015, the museum lost more than $2.5 million on revenue of $59 million.

The Freedom Forum reported that the losses had led to controversial proposals for strategies that might improve the museum's finances. The issues, in part, reached back to the Washington location's construction, which had significant cost overruns. Furthermore, the numerous free museums in the National Mall area, such as those of the Smithsonian Institution and National Gallery of Art, made it difficult for visitors to justify paying the Newseum's steep entry fees. In August 2017, the Newseum's president, Jeffrey Herbst, resigned in the face of the museum's financial problems.

In February 2018, The Washington Post reported that the Newseum was exploring the sale of its building or a move. The Freedom Forum informed The Washington Post that it had been financing over $20 million a year in continued operating expenses. In January 2019, the Freedom Forum announced that it would sell the Newseum building to The Johns Hopkins University for $372.5 million. The Washington Post subsequently published a detailed account of the financial difficulties that the museum had encountered, which included a loss of over $100 million at the time of sale due to the facility's cost having risen to $477 million. The museum closed to the public on December 31, 2019.

On July 12, 2019, Johns Hopkins presented designs that showed the removal of the First Amendment etched stone panel from the building's façade. The Newseum building was gutted in 2021 to prepare for construction of the Hopkins facility.

See also

List of museums in Washington, D.C.

References

External links

 

History museums in Washington, D.C.
Defunct museums in Washington, D.C.
Journalism
Mass media museums in the United States
Museums established in 1997
Museums disestablished in 2019
Telecommunications museums in the United States
2008 establishments in Washington, D.C.
2019 disestablishments in Washington, D.C.
Northwest (Washington, D.C.)